Brazil competed at the 2011 Winter Universiade in Erzurum, Turkey. Brazil sent 4 athletes, the most ever sent by Brazil.

Alpine skiing

Brazil sent one male alpine skier.
Men
Paulo Setubal

Figure skating

Men

Women

References

Winter Universidade
Nations at the 2011 Winter Universiade
Brazil at the Winter Universiade